This is a list of women writers who were born in Nicaragua or whose writings are closely associated with that country.

A
Claribel Alegría, pen name of Clara Isabel Alegría Vides (1924–2018), poet, essayist, novelist, journalist

B
Gioconda Belli (born 1948), novelist, poet
Yolanda Blanco (born 1954), poet

C
Blanca Castellón (born 1958), poet

G
Karly Gaitán Morales (born 1980), journalist, non-fiction writer

J
Florence Jaugey (born 1959), French-born screenwriter, film director

M
Christianne Meneses Jacobs (born 1971), educator, children's magazine publisher
Sofía Montenegro (born 1954), journalist, researcher, feminist
Rosario Murillo (born 1951), poet, first lady of Nicaragua

S
Mariana Sansón Argüello (1918–2002), poet
María Teresa Sánchez (1918–1994), poet, publisher

T
Josefa Toledo de Aguerri (1866–1962), feminist writer, journal publisher

Z
Daisy Zamora (born 1950), acclaimed poet

See also
List of women writers
List of Spanish-language authors

References

-
Nicaraguan
Writers
Writers, women